FELDA New Zealand or Kampung New Zealand is a FELDA settlement in Maran District, Pahang, Malaysia. The settlement was named after New Zealand.

References

Maran District
Villages in Pahang
Federal Land Development Authority settlements